Balrothery East is one of the baronies of Ireland. Originally part of the Lordship of Meath, it was then constituted as part of the old county of Dublin. Today, it lies in the modern county of Fingal. 

The barony of Balrothery was created by Hugh de Lacy, Lord of Meath as his own feudal barony, held directly from himself in capite. His vassals were commonly called "De Lacy's Barons".  Balrothery, thus once a feudal title of nobility, was later split into eastern and western divisions.

At the heart of the barony is the civil parish of Balrothery in the northwest of the barony, one of eight civil parishes in the barony.

Location
It is bordered by the baronies of Balrothery West to the west and Nethercross to the south; by County Meath to the north and by the Irish Sea to the east.

History
It was organised soon after the Norman invasion of Ireland by Hugh de Lacy, Lord of Meath. Balrothery East formerly included Lambay Island, which is now part of the barony of Nethercross.

Civil parishes
The barony is divided into five civil parishes: Balrothery, Baldongan, Balscaddan, Holmpatrick, and Lusk, The main population centres of the barony are Balbriggan,  Skerries, Rush, and Lusk.

See also
List of subdivisions of County Dublin

References

From :

 
History of Fingal